Freeman is a given name. Notable people with the name include:

Freeman Asmundson (born 1943) Canadian ice hockey player 
Freeman Barr (born 1973), Bahamian boxers
Freeman Bosley Jr. (born 1954), American politician
Freeman Wills Crofts (1879–1957), Irish writer
Freeman Davis or Brother Bones (1902–1974), American recording artist
Freeman Davis (soldier) (1842–1899), American soldier
Freeman Dyson (1923–2020) English-born American theoretical physicist and mathematician
Freeman Fitzgerald (1891–?), American football player
Freeman Freeman-Thomas, 1st Marquess of Willingdon (1866–1941), British politician
Freeman Gosden (1899–1982), American radio comedian, actor and pioneer
Freeman A. Hrabowski III (born 1950) African American educator, advocate, and mathematician
Freeman King (1943–2002), American comedian
Freeman Knowles (1846–1910) American politician and publisher
Freeman Lord (1842–1917), American politician
Freeman McNeil (born 1959), American football player
Freeman Osonuga (born 1984), Nigerian physician and humanitarian
Freeman Patterson (born 1937), Canadian nature photographer and writer
Freeman Ransom (1880–1947), American lawyer and businessman
Freeman G. Teed (born 1916), American politician
Freeman Thomas (born 1957), American automobile and industrial designer 
Freeman Thorpe (1844–1922), American painter 
Freeman Tilden (1883–1980), American environmentalist
Freeman Walker (1780–1827), American politician
Freeman White (born 1943), American football player
Freeman White (politician) (born 1946), Canadian politician
Freeman Williams (1956–2022), American basketball player

Fictional Characters
Freeman Lowell, protagonist of the film Silent Running

See also
Freman Hendrix (born 1950, American politician